Frank Troosters (born 8 November 1970) is a Belgian politician for Vlaams Belang and a member of the Chamber of Representatives.

Troosters is a city councilor for Vlaams Belang in Hasselt and leads the local faction of the party there. In 2018, Troosters opposed the construction of a new mosque in Hasselt and in 2020, led a protest with VB leader Tom Van Grieken against turning a hotel in the district into a refugee and migrant housing centre.  Troosters has also been an MP in the federal parliament for the Limburg constituency since 2019.

References 

1970 births
Living people
Belgian critics of Islam
Vlaams Belang politicians
Members of the Belgian Federal Parliament
21st-century Belgian politicians
People from Hasselt